Randall Wyn Fullmer (born April 27, 1950) is an American businessman and former executive for The Walt Disney Company. After a successful eighteen-year career at Walt Disney Feature Animation, Fullmer launched his own business, Wyn Guitars, through which he handcrafts bass guitars of his own design, often in close collaboration with the intended instrument owners.

Early life
Fullmer was born on April 27, 1950 in Richland, Washington.  His father was a nuclear physicist and his mother was a physical therapist.  While Fullmer always had artistic and musical inclinations—drawing, painting, building and playing musical instruments—his parents were not convinced that such creative pursuits were ever going to amount to anything, hoping that one day he'd "get that out of his system.” Nevertheless, Fullmer continued to proceed along an artistic path and made a name for himself in several creative circles.

Education
Fullmer studied architecture for two years at Washington State University (WSU), from 1968 to 1970. During his second year at WSU, he took a film class and became hopelessly hooked on animation, which motivated him to apply to California Institute of the Arts (Cal Arts). Fullmer was accepted into the animation program at Cal Arts and graduated in 1974 with a degree as a Bachelor of Fine Arts.

Animator
After graduation from Cal Arts, Fullmer spent roughly seven years running his own animation business producing works such as: medical, scientific and other educational films; segments for Sesame Street; television commercials; and Saturday morning television programs.
In 1983 and 1984, Fullmer worked for Don Bluth Studios, creating special effects for Dragon's Lair and Space Ace, the first video games to be produced on laserdisc. Fullmer also worked at Apogee, John Dykstra's live action special effects house, and he then moved on to Filmation, where he animated on both television and theatrical features from 1985 to 1987. He worked on projects shuch as Happily Ever After, BraveStarr, She-Ra: Princess of Power and Ghostbusters.

In 1987, Fullmer was hired by Walt Disney Feature Animation (now known as Walt Disney Animation Studios) for a three-month contract to animate on the “Toon Town” section of Who Framed Roger Rabbit, a job that turned into an 18-year career at The Walt Disney Studios.  Fullmer's animation film credits include: effects animator on Oliver & Company; effects animator on The Little Mermaid; effects supervisor on The Rescuers Down Under; visual effects supervisor on Beauty and the Beast; artistic coordinator on The Lion King; artistic coordinator on The Hunchback of Notre Dame; producer on The Emperor's New Groove; and producer on Chicken Little.

He and director Mark Dindal worked on many special effects projects both in Filmation and at Disney.

Musician
Fullmer started taking trombone lessons at the age of six, but his arm wasn't long enough to hit all the scale notes until he was eight. By age ten, he was taking guitar lessons, and within a year, he appeared on television playing a duet of Malagueña with his guitar teacher.

At the age of twelve, Fullmer asked his parents if he could buy a 12-string guitar to complement his 6-string electric guitar. When they said, “no, you already have a guitar, you don't need another one," Fullmer asked if he could purchase the wood to build his own 12-string instead. His parents were so thrown by this bizarre request that they acquiesced.  Over the next six years, Fullmer proceeded to build approximately 30 guitars, craftsmanship that was both self-taught and mentored by an old country western fiddle maker named Tom.  (Fullmer continued to build guitars throughout his life, but this task was relegated to hobby status while his animation career took precedence.)

Fullmer formed several rock bands with friends throughout his youth, including the rock group "The Isle of Phyve" which toured the Pacific Northwest on weekends, summers and holidays while Fullmer was in high school.

Wyn Guitars
Wyn Guitars was established in 2006. Fullmer is both the founder and sole luthier for the company and has crafted guitars for musical talents including Jimmy Haslip, Abraham Laboriel, James LoMenzo, Ben Jones, Stewart McKinsey, Robin Zielhorst, Maurice Fitzgerald, Adam Johnson and Ethan Farmer, among others.

Wyn is Fullmer’s middle name, given to him as a tribute to a Welsh uncle who also happened to be musically inclined.

Restrung

A documentary, called Restrung, was made in 2014 about Fullmer's career making guitars from 2006 to now. The film was made by Mike Enns, after being fascinated with Fullmer's guitar making. It also talks about his time as a kid making guitars as a hobby and his time at the Disney Company. The film also marks a return to film director Mark Dindal. As of 2015, the film can be viewed on YouTube.

Filmography

Nominations 
 Best Visual Effects for Beauty and the Beast (BAFTA Award) (1993)
 Best Animated Feature for The Emperor's New Groove (Online Film and Television Association Award) (2001)
 Outstanding Producer of Animated Feature Motion Picture for Chicken Little (PGA Award) (2006)

See also 
 Mark Dindal, a frequent collaborator with Fullmer
 Restrung

References

External links
 Wyn Guitars
 

American animated film producers
1950 births
People from Richland, Washington
Animators from Washington (state)
Special effects people
California Institute of the Arts alumni
Washington State University alumni
Guitar makers
Living people
Musical instrument manufacturing companies of the United States
Film producers from Washington (state)
Walt Disney Animation Studios people